Cloppenburg – Vechta is an electoral constituency (German: Wahlkreis) represented in the Bundestag. It elects one member via first-past-the-post voting. Under the current constituency numbering system, it is designated as constituency 32. It is located in northwestern Lower Saxony, comprising the Cloppenburg and Vechta districts.

Cloppenburg – Vechta was created for the inaugural 1949 federal election. Since 2017, it has been represented by Silvia Breher of the Christian Democratic Union (CDU). It is considered one of the safest seats for the CDU, which often receives an absolute majority of the popular vote. This is partly due to the region being very catholic in an otherwise majority-protestant state.

Geography
Cloppenburg – Vechta is located in northwestern Lower Saxony. As of the 2021 federal election, it comprises the entirety of the Cloppenburg and Vechta districts.

History
Cloppenburg – Vechta was created in 1949, then known as Vechta – Cloppenburg. From 1965 to 1980, it was named Cloppenburg. It acquired its current name in the 1980 election. In the inaugural Bundestag election, it was Lower Saxony constituency 9 in the numbering system. From 1953 through 1961, it was number 31. From 1965 through 1998, it was number 27. From 2002 through 2009, it was number 33. Since 2013, it has been constituency 32.

Originally, the constituency comprised the districts of Cloppenburg and Vechta, as well as the municipalities of Großenkneten, Hatten, Wardenburg, and Wüsting from the Landkreis Oldenburg district. Since the 1965 election, it has comprised only the districts of Cloppenburg and Vechta.

Members
The constituency has been held continuously by the Christian Democratic Union (CDU) since its creation. It is a traditional stronghold of the CDU, frequently the party's safest constituency. Its first representative was Georg Kühling, who served a single term from 1949 to 1953. He was succeeded by Kurt Schmücker, who served five terms. Manfred Carstens then represented it for nine terms from 1972 to 2005. Franz-Josef Holzenkamp served until 2017. Silvia Breher won the constituency in 2017, and was re-elected in 2021.

Election results

2021 election

2017 election

2013 election

2009 election

Notes

References

Federal electoral districts in Lower Saxony
Cloppenburg (district)
Vechta (district)
1949 establishments in West Germany
Constituencies established in 1949